Irene O'Keeffe is a former camogie player, scorer of two goals in two minutes during the first half for Cork in their 1998 All Ireland final victory over Galway.

Career
She won five All Ireland senior medals in all, in 1992, when Cork halted Kilkenny's great run of seven in a row, 1993, 1995, 1997 and 1998.

References

External links
 Camogie.ie Official Camogie Association Website

Cork camogie players
Living people
Year of birth missing (living people)